The Central District of Zahedan County is a district (bakhsh) in Zahedan County, Sistan and Baluchestan province, Iran. At the 2006 census, its population was 577,898, in 114,552 families. The district has one city: Zahedan. The district has two rural districts (dehestan): Cheshmeh Ziarat Rural District and Hormak Rural District. At the 2016 census, its population had risen to 628,219.

References 

Zahedan County
Districts of Sistan and Baluchestan Province
Populated places in Zahedan County